Warlpiri may refer to:
 Warlpiri people, an indigenous people of the Tanami Desert, Central Australia.
 Warlpiri language, their language